Cowie (Scottish Gaelic: Collaidh, meaning wooded place) is a village in the Stirling council area of Scotland. The United Kingdom Census 2011 recorded the population as 2,713.

Excavations have identified Mesolithic and Neolithic settlement remains at Chapelfield.

Cowie was formerly a pit village and stone quarrying was carried on in the surrounds. It is now the site of a factory manufacturing engineered wood products and other light industries.

Recent years have seen significant new housing developments in the village for commuters.

References

Villages in Stirling (council area)